Machabeli (sing. ; pl. მაჩაბლები, Machablebi) was a Georgian princely house (tavadi) which held a large fiefdom (satavado) in the province of Inner Kartli (central Georgia) called Samachablo after their family name.

The origin of the family is not clear. According to a traditional account, they descended from one of the princes of the Abkhaz-Georgian feudal clan of Anchabadze who had fled the disorders in Abkhazia. Another version holds it that the Machabeli were an offshoot of the Tavkhelidze family who adopted their dynastic name after the village of Achabeti on the Great Liakhvi River where their initial domain was located. Beginning with the 15th century, the Machabeli grew in prominence and held various important posts at the court of the Georgian kings of Kartli. Their fiefdom, Samachablo, covered a significant portion of what is now South Ossetia, and enjoyed a degree of autonomy within the Kingdom of Kartli from c. 1470 to 1800 when Georgia was annexed to Imperial Russia. The Machabeli house was confirmed in princely dignity by the Russian Tsar in 1850.

See also 

Ivane Machabeli
Georges V. Matchabelli
Tamarasheni
Abkhazi

References 

 Хаханов А. С. (Alexander Khakhanov), князья Мачабели. In: Грузинские дворянские акты и родословные росписи. М. 1893.

Families of Georgia (country)
Noble families of Georgia (country)
Georgian-language surnames